Mount Putnam is a summit in the U.S. state of Idaho, with an elevation of .

Mount Putnam was named after Captain James E. Putnam, 12th U.S. Infantry, who was in command of the detachment, which established the Fort Hall Military Post at Lincoln Creek in 1870. A variant name was "North Putman Peak".

References

Putnam
Mountains of Bannock County, Idaho